Thomas Colley (died 24 August 1751) was an English chimney sweep, executed for the murder of accused witch Ruth Osborne at Tring, Hertfordshire.

Colley was one of the leaders of a mob which gathered at Tring in April 1751 and seized an elderly couple, John and Ruth Osborne, from the local workhouse, accusing them of witchcraft.  The mob subjected the pair to a dunking at a nearby pond in Wilstone.  Ruth was beaten and dragged through the water repeatedly, until Colley drowned her by turning her face-down with a stick.  John survived and testified at Colley's trial.

Colley was convicted of murder and hanged in chains at Gubblecote Cross.

See also
 Witch trials in Early Modern Europe

References

Secondary sources

 

Year of birth missing
1751 deaths
1751 crimes
People executed for murder
English people convicted of murder
Witchcraft in England
Executed English people
People executed by the Kingdom of Great Britain
People executed by England and Wales by hanging
Vigilantes
Witch hunters